Coal Creek Township is one of eleven townships in Montgomery County, Indiana, United States. As of the 2010 census, its population was 1,544 and it contained 655 housing units.

Coal Creek Township took its name from Coal Creek, which was so named from the deposits of coal in its hillsides.

Geography

Cities, towns, villages
 New Richmond
 Wingate

Unincorporated towns
 Elmdale at 
(This list is based on USGS data and may include former settlements.)

Cemeteries
The township contains these seven cemeteries: Meharry, Mount Pleasant, Oakland, Old Turkey Run, Pleasant Hill, Willhite and Wilson Killen.

Public safety

Fire and basic medical service is provided by Coal Creek Fire & Rescue Inc.  CCF&R is the only volunteer fire department within Montgomery County to boast more than one fire station.  A new building, completed in 2006, resides in New Richmond, and recently in 2010, CCFD opened a newer facility in Wingate, although both towns each had a fire hall prior to recently relocating.

Ambulance service is provided by S.T.A.R. http://starambulance.net/

CCF&R is funded by contracts from both the towns of Wingate and New Richmond, as well as by taxes paid to the Township Trustee.

Law enforcement service is provided by the Montgomery County Sheriff's Department as well as the Indiana State Police, Wingate Town Marshal.

School districts
 North Montgomery Community School Corporation

Political districts
 Indiana's 4th congressional district
 State House District 41
 State Senate District 23

References

External links
 Indiana Township Association
 United Township Association of Indiana
 City-Data.com page for Coal Creek Township
 
 United States Census Bureau 2008 TIGER/Line Shapefiles
 IndianaMap

Townships in Montgomery County, Indiana
Townships in Indiana